Salt Creek Township is one of the twenty-five townships of Muskingum County, Ohio, United States.  The 2000 census found 1,113 people in the township.

Geography
Located in the southeastern part of the county, it borders the following townships:
Perry Township - north
Union Township - northeast
Rich Hill Township - east
Meigs Township - southeast corner
Blue Rock Township - south
Wayne Township - west

No municipalities are located in Salt Creek Township, although the unincorporated community of Chandlersville lies in the western part of the township.

Name and history
Salt Creek Township was named after its Salt Creek. It is one of five Salt Creek Townships statewide.

By the 1830s, Salt Creek Township had several mills and salt factories, and two churches.

Government
The township is governed by a three-member board of trustees, who are elected in November of odd-numbered years to a four-year term beginning on the following January 1. Two are elected in the year after the presidential election and one is elected in the year before it. There is also an elected township fiscal officer, who serves a four-year term beginning on April 1 of the year after the election, which is held in November of the year before the presidential election. Vacancies in the fiscal officership or on the board of trustees are filled by the remaining trustees.

References

External links
County website

Townships in Muskingum County, Ohio
Townships in Ohio